Rudolph Friedrich Wasmann (8 August 1805, Hamburg – 10 May 1886, Merano) was a German-born painter in the Biedermeier style. He spent most of his life in a part of the Tyrol that is now in Italy.

Life 
At the age of seventeen, he began an apprenticeship with the painter Christoffer Suhr. Then, after several years of study at the Dresden Academy of Fine Arts and the Academy of Fine Arts, Munich, he spent two years in Merano. From 1832 to 1835 he lived in Rome, where he came under the influence of Friedrich Overbeck, Joseph Anton Koch, and other members of the Nazarene movement. He eventually converted to Catholicism.

After six more years spent in Merano and Bolzano, where he worked as a portrait painter, he returned to Hamburg, where he was introduced to his future wife, Emilie Krämer. They married in 1846 and went to live with her step-mother back in Merano. In addition to portraits, he produced landscapes and religiously-themed works in Nazarene style as well as a popular autobiography. Many of his works are on display at the Kunsthalle Hamburg. A street in the Barmbek-Nord district is named after him.

His son was the Jesuit priest and entomologist, Erich Wasmann.

References

Autobiography 
 Ein deutsches Künstlerleben, von ihm selbst geschildert. Edited by Bernt Grønvold,  Verlagsanstalt F. Bruckmann Aktien-Gesellschaft (1896), "Popular edition" by Insel-Verlag (1915)

Further reading 
  Friedrich Wasmann und vier andre deutsche Meister seiner Zeit. Ausstellungskatalog 1922. Mit einer Einführung von Hans Wolff, Hegner u. Päßler, Dresden 1922
 Friedrich Wasmann, Sein Leben und Werk. Ein Beitrag zur Geschichte der Malerei des neunzehnten Jahrhunderts von Peter Nathan, F. Bruckmann Verlag, München 1954
 Hans Eckstein: Ausstellungsrezension Sammlung Bernt Grönvold in der Ludwigsgalerie München in: Kunst und Künstler; illustrated monthly for the fine arts and crafts, Vol.30, 1931

External links 

 ArtNet: More works by Wasmann
 Tirolerland TV: Der Maler Friedrich Wasmann (video)

1805 births
1886 deaths
German male painters
Portrait painters
Nazarene movement
19th-century German painters
19th-century German male artists